Capital: The Eruption of Delhi (also published as Capital: A Portrait of Twenty-First Century Delhi) is a 2014 book by British-born, Indian-based writer Rana Dasgupta.

Background and synopsis
Capital is an exploration of the transformation of Delhi since Dasgupta first moved to the city in 2001. It explores the changes Delhi has experienced since the boom of the Indian economy, particularly through encounters with residents of Delhi, ranging from billionaires to slum dwellers and drug dealers to metal traders. These personal stories are interwoven with over a century of history of the city.

Reception
Writing for The Observer Jason Burke praised Capital as an "intense, lyrical, erudite and powerful book" but wrote that Dasgupta's "unstated but apparent nostalgia for rural life...sometimes jars. There is nothing particularly bucolic about India's villages."

In 2017 Capital received the Ryszard Kapuściński Award for Literary Reportage. It was also short-listed for the Orwell Prize and for the Royal Society of Literature Ondaatje Prize.

References

2014 non-fiction books
Books about Delhi
Canongate Books books
Penguin Books books